Dragonchess is a three-dimensional fantasy chess variant created by Gary Gygax, co-creator of the famed role-playing game Dungeons & Dragons. The game was introduced in 1985 in issue No. 100 of Dragon Magazine.

Boards and pieces
The Dragonchess gameboard consists of three vertically stacked 12×8 levels. The upper level (blue and white) represents the air, the middle level (green and amber) represents the land, and the lower level (red and brown) is the subterranean world .

The Dragonchess game pieces (42 per player) are an ensemble of characters and monsters inspired or derived from fantasy settings in Dungeons & Dragons. Intricate inter- and intra-level game piece capabilities are defined. As in chess, White moves first and then players take turns, and the game is won by delivering checkmate (inescapable attack) to the enemy king.

Upper

Sylph (S)
On level 3:
 can move one step diagonally forward, or capture one step straight forward;
 can capture on the square directly below on level 2.
On level 2:
 can move to the square directly above on level 3, or to one of the player's six Sylph starting squares.

Griffon (G)
On level 3:
 can move and capture by jumping in the following pattern: two steps diagonally followed by one step orthogonally outward;
 can move and capture one step along a space diagonal to level 2.
On level 2:
 can move and capture one step diagonally;
 can move and capture one step along a space diagonal to level 3.

Dragon (R)
can move and capture as a chess king+bishop on level 3;
 can capture remotely (without leaving level 3) on the square directly below on level 2, or on any square orthogonally adjacent to that square.

Middle

Warrior (W)
 can move and capture like a chess pawn on level 2 but without the initial two-step option;
 promotes to Hero when reaching the furthest rank.

Oliphant (O)
 can move and capture like a chess rook on level 2.

Unicorn (U)
 can move and capture like a chess knight on level 2.

Hero (H)
On level 2:
 can move and capture one or two unblockable steps diagonally;
 can move and capture one step along a space diagonal to levels 1 or 3.
On levels 1 and 3:
 can move and capture back to the square on level 2 the Hero previously left.

Thief (T)
 can move and capture like a chess bishop on level 2.

Cleric (C)
On any level:
 can move and capture like a chess king;
 can move and capture to the square directly above or directly below on an adjacent level.

Mage (M)
On level 2:
 can move and capture like a chess queen.
On levels 1 and 3:
 can move one step orthogonally.
On any level:
 can move and capture one or two steps (blockable) directly above or directly below to one of the other levels.

King (K)
On level 2:
 can move and capture like a chess king;
 can move and capture to the square directly below on level 1 or directly above on level 3.
On levels 1 and 3:
 can move to (only) the same square on level 2 the King previously left.

Paladin (P)
On level 2:
can move and capture as a chess king+knight.
On levels 1 and 3:
can move and capture like a chess king.
On any level:
can move to the other levels using a knight-like move: one level up or down followed by two steps orthogonally, or two levels up or down followed by one step orthogonally.

Lower

Dwarf (D)
On level 1:
 can move one step straight forward or sideways, or capture one step diagonally forward;
 can capture on the square directly above on level 2.
On level 2:
 can move one step straight forward or sideways, or capture one step diagonally forward;
 can move to the square directly below on level 1.

Basilisk (B)
 can move and capture one step diagonally forward or straight forward on level 1, or move one step straight backward;
 automatically freezes (immobilizes) an enemy piece on the square directly above on level 2, whether the Basilisk moves to the space below or the enemy moves to the space above, and until the Basilisk moves away or is captured.

Elemental (E)
On level 1:
 can move and capture one or two steps orthogonally;
 can move one step diagonally;
 can capture in the following pattern: one step orthogonally followed by the square directly above on level 2.
On level 2:
 can move and capture in the following pattern: the square directly below on level 1 followed by one step orthogonally.

Move notation
Recording moves is done the same as in algebraic notation for chess, extended to a 12×8 board, with the addition of a numeric prefix (1, 2, or 3) in front of each square coordinate to identify the level. So for example, White's Elemental starts on square 1g1 (level 1, square g1); Black's King starts on 2g8; and so on.

Notes

References

Bibliography

External links
 Dragonchess by Edward Jackman, The Chess Variant Pages
 More on Dragonchess by Hans Bodlaender, The Chess Variant Pages

 Dragonchess a simple program by Ed Friedlander (Java)

1985 in chess
Board games introduced in 1985
Chess variants
Fairy chess
Gary Gygax games